Kantragada (కంట్రగడ) is a village in Palasa mandal, Srikakulam district in the state of Andhra Pradesh, India. It is located on the border of Andhra Pradesh and Orissa which over 1.5 km away. The village established on the water stream of Varahalagadda during mid 19th century during British colonial period, people migrated from near by village Goppili. Kantragada geographical area was a part of Tharlakota kingdom under Kalingas.

Geography 

The Eastern Ghats pass through the village. The foothills of Eastern Ghats like Ghojarai and Bhurujol are very near by. The village is well connected to towns including Palasa (10 km) towards East and Mandasa (14 km) towards North, Garabandha (11 km) towards West and Paralakhemundi (34 km) towards southwest.

Transport 

National Highway 16, a part of Golden Quadrilateral highway network, is 9 km from the village. The nearest railway station is Palasa railway station having a distance of 12 km and the nearest airport is Visakhapatnam Airport at a distance of 200 km.

Administration and politics 

Kantragada is a part of Rentikota Panchayat and Palasa mandal. Kantragada official language is Telugu. The village comes under Palasa (Assembly constituency) in Andhra Pradesh Legislative Assembly. Kantragada pincode is 532221 and STD code 08945.

Places of Interest 

The popular Gandahati waterfall is located in Gajapati District of Odisha is just 17 km away. The historical Mahendragiri hills were located around 40 km from the village. Nearest beach is Akkupalli is located at a distance of 23 km.

References

External links

Villages in Srikakulam district